I Scream Records is an independent record label founded by Laurens Kusters in 1994 in Brussels, Belgium. The label has an extensive catalogue and is one of the leading punk and hardcore labels in Western Europe.

History 
The label's first release was from the band Deviate, a band in which Laurens Kusters played the drums. By the late nineties, I Scream Records had over 25 active bands.

In late 2005, I Scream Records opened its US headquarters to work its rosters of bands (90% of which are American) through its own network. Previously, the label's masters were issued under license in the USA by companies such as Victory Records, Bridge 9 Records and Thorp Records.

Early successes include releases from Deviate, Discipline, Hardsell, Backfire!, Stigmata, Agnostic Front, Blood for Blood and Vision.

Recently the label has released records by Life of Agony, Madball, Skarhead, Wisdom in Chains, Incite, Death by Stereo, The Last Resort, Reno Divorce, MOD, Jaya the Cat, Stigma, Guajiro and Tying Tiffany to name of few. I Scream Records has also teamed up with Roadrunner Records to re-issue some of their old masters by bands such as Wrecking Crew, Token Entry & Earth Crisis.

In 2008 I Scream Records teamed up with ADA for an exclusive North American distribution deal and extended that deal with ADA Global for the rest of the world in 2009.
That same year the label also signed a worldwide co-publishing deal with EMI Publishing for its copyrights.

I Scream is currently being distributed by Avex Group in Japan since April 2010, with the first offering being Incite's new album The slaughter.

Complete roster 

3 Lost Maniacs
10 Seconds Down
Agnostic Front
Awkward Thought
Backfire!
Bad Luck Charms
Beans
Beowulf
Blood for Blood
The Blue Bloods
Breakdown
The Change
Convict
Crackjaw
Darkbuster
Death & Taxes
Death by Stereo
Death Threat
Deathkiller
Determined
Deviate
Devil in Me
Disciple
Discipline
Do or Die
Down But Not Out
The Ducky Boys
Earth Crisis
Eightball
Enemy Rose
Fabulous Disaster
Far from Finished
Green Lizard
Guajiro
Gwyllions
Hardsell
The Heartaches
Heideroosjes
Homethrust
Hoods
I Reject
Incite
Inhuman
Janez Detd.
Jaya the Cat
Joe Coffee
Judasville
Kickback
Krutch
The Last Resort
Length of Time
Life of Agony
Lionheart
The Lulabelles
Madball
Mark Lind
Maximum Penalty
Mercy Killers
MOD
Mug-Shot
My City Burning
Nervous Chillin'
No Trigger
North Side Kings
On the Rise
Paranoiacs
Payback
Pilgrimz
Pitboss 2000
Powerhouse
Ramallah
Reno Divorce
Right Direction
Run, Devil, Run
Skarhead
Slapshot
Slumlords
Spider Crew
Spoiler
Squaler
Stars and Stripes
Stemm
Stigma
Stigmata
Stuck Up
Tech-9
Thumbs Down
Token Entry
Tying Tiffany
The Unseen
Uppercut
La Vieja Guardia
Vision
Void Section
The Welch Boys
Wisdom in Chains
Wrecking Crew

References

External links 
 Official website

Record labels established in 1994
Belgian record labels